Faraklo is a village in Laconia, Greece. It has a population of 96, and an elevation of approximately 400 metres. It has strong ties with the city of Neapolis. Snow is infrequent, but does occur.

References

Populated places in Laconia